The Wasatch Wave is a weekly newspaper in Heber, Utah, United States. It was started in 1889. It has a current circulation of 4,200 and is owned by Wave Publishing, Inc. In 2007, it won the General Excellence award from the Utah Press Association in its category. In June 2018, the Wave was named June Business of the Month by the Heber Valley Chamber of Commerce.

Historical digital archives are available at Utah Digital Newspapers.

Bibliography
Merwin G. Fairbanks, A History of The Wasatch Wave, A Weekly Newspaper in Heber, Utah, Provo, Utah: Brigham Young University, 1964, 280pp.

References

External links
Official website
Wasatch Wave, 1889-1922

Newspapers published in Utah
Weekly newspapers published in the United States
1889 establishments in Utah Territory